Eulasiopalpus is a genus of parasitic flies in the family Tachinidae. There are about nine described species in Eulasiopalpus.

Species
These nine species belong to the genus Eulasiopalpus:
 Eulasiopalpus corpulentus Townsend, 1914
 Eulasiopalpus gertschi Curran, 1947
 Eulasiopalpus mirimodis Reinhard, 1975
 Eulasiopalpus niveus Townsend, 1914
 Eulasiopalpus obscurus Townsend, 1914
 Eulasiopalpus subalpinus Townsend, 1912
 Eulasiopalpus tatei Curran, 1947
 Eulasiopalpus typicus Curran, 1947
 Eulasiopalpus vittatus Curran, 1947

References

Further reading

 
 
 
 

Tachinidae
Articles created by Qbugbot